Siegler is a surname. Notable people with the surname include:

Edward Siegler (1881–1942), American gymnast and athlete
M. G. Siegler (born 1981), American blogger and venture capitalist
Mark Siegler (born 1941), American physician
Robert S. Siegler (born 1949), American psychologist
Sammy Siegler (born 1973), American rock drummer

See also
Lear Siegler, created from a merger between the Siegler Corporation (Los Angeles) and Lear Avionics Inc. (Santa Monica) in 1961
Siegler Corporation, created by a group of investors in 1952 in Chicago, Illinois